The following list is a discography of production by DeVante Swing

1990

Al B. Sure! –  Private Times...and the Whole 9! –  "Touch You",  "Had Enuf?",  "Sure! Thang", "You Excite Me"
Jeff Redd – A Quiet Storm – "In My House", "Giving My Love to You"
Father MC – "Lisa Baby" (Daddy Radio Remix)

1991

Jodeci – Forever My Lady (entire album)
Jodeci – Strictly Business soundtrack – "Let's Fly"

1992 

Christopher Williams – Changes – "All I See", "Please, Please, Please"
Mary J. Blige – What's the 411? – "I Don't Want To Do Anything Else" featuring K-Ci Hailey of Jodeci
Michael Cooper – Get Closer – "I Just Love You", "Do You"
CeCe Peniston – Finally – "I See Love"
Al B. Sure! – Sexy Versus – "Playing Games", "Turn You Out"

1993 

Jodeci – Diary of a Mad Band (entire album)
Jodeci – Who's the Man? soundtrack – "Let's Go Through the Motions"

1994 

Usher – Usher – "Can U Get wit It",  "Whispers (Co-produced w/ Darryl Pearson)"
Changing Faces – Changing Faces – "Keep It Right There",  "Keep It Right There (Remix)"
Various Artists – Above the Rim soundtrack – H-Town – "Part Time Lover" , B-Rezell – "Blowed Away"
Various Artists – Murder Was the Case – Jodeci featuring Tha Dogg Pound – Co-Produced – "Come Up To My Room"  
Sista – 4 All the Sistas Around da World (entire album, excluding track #9)

1995 

Jodeci – The Show, the After Party, the Hotel  (entire album, excluding track #4 and #8)
Al Green – Your Heart's in Good Hands – "Could This Be Love"
Various Artists – Dangerous Minds soundtrack – DeVante Swing featuring Static – "Gin & Juice"
Tony Thompson – Sexsational – "Slave"

1996 

2Pac – All Eyez on Me – "No More Pain"
Montell Jordan – More... – "What's on Tonight"
Various Artists – The Nutty Professor soundtrack – Da Bassment – "Love You Down"
Horace Brown – Horace Brown – "You Need A Man"
Danny Boy – "Slip N' Slide" (Co-produced w/ Reggie "Devell" Moore)

1997 

K-Ci & JoJo – Love Always – "Still Waiting"
Mariah Carey – Butterfly – "The Beautiful Ones" (featuring Dru Hill)

1998
Kurupt – Kuruption! –  "I Wanna...", "Put That On Something"

1999

Imajin – Imajin – "Fresh", "I Don't Wanna Play Basketball"

2000

Liberty City Fla – Liberty City Fla – "Come On Back"
Dalvin DeGrate – Met.A.Mor.Phic –   "Dangerous" 
K-Ci & JoJo – X – "Get Back", "Slip and Fall" (Hidden Track)

2001

Le-Jit – What's the Worst That Could Happen? soundtrack – "My Love, Your Love"
Terrell – Uptown International – "Who Got", "Loyalty"
Ray J – This Ain't a Game – "Wet Me"

2002

Aerosmith – O, Yeah! Ultimate Aerosmith Hits – "Lay It Down"

2005

DJ Quik – Trauma – "Quikstrumental (Quik's Groove 7)" (featuring Jodeci) (Co -produced w/ David Blake and Dalvin Degrate)

2007

Mýa – Liberation-"Smilin" (Co – produced w/ Dalvin Degrate) (Unreleased)

2009
Mariah Carey - Memoirs of an Imperfect Angel "The Impossible"

2010

Danny Boy – It's About Time – "If U Don't Mind", "It's All About U"
Mighty Clouds of Joy – At the Revival- "I Love You Lord" (Co-produced with Raphael Saadiq)

2014

Anthony Lewis – "Candy Rain" feat. Billy Bang (Co – produced w/ Bradd Young)

2015

Jodeci – The Past, The Present, The Future (entire album)

Production discographies